Recursion theorem can refer to:
 The recursion theorem in set theory
 Kleene's recursion theorem, also called the fixed point theorem, in computability theory
 The master theorem (analysis of algorithms), about the complexity of divide-and-conquer algorithms